The 1942 United States Senate election in Nebraska was held on November 3, 1942. 

Incumbent Independent George W. Norris lost re-election to a sixth term to Republican Kenneth Wherry. 

Norris, a former Republican, was quoted as remarking, “I would rather go down to my political grave with a clear conscience than ride in the chariot of victory.” In part for his honesty with constituents even if it meant defeat, Norris was later featured in John F. Kennedy's Pulitzer Prize-winning Profiles in Courage.

Republican primary

Candidates
 Hugh Ashmore
 Voyle Rector
 Kenneth Wherry, former state senator and mayor of Pawnee City; candidate for U.S. Senate in 1934 and governor in 1932

Results

Democratic primary

Candidates
 Terry Carpenter, former U.S. Representative from Scottsbluff, nominee for Senator in 1936, and perennial candidate
 Harry B. Coffee, U.S. Representative from Chadron
 Foster May, radio newsman and candidate for U.S. Representative in 1936
 Lawrence Moore
 John C. Mullin
 George Olsen
 William Ritchie

Results

Independents 
 George W. Norris, incumbent senator first elected in 1912
 Albert F. Ruthven

General election

Results

See also 
 1942 United States Senate elections

References 

1942
Nebraska
United States Senate